The 2021–22 ICE Hockey League season begin on 16 September 2021. The league's title sponsor was bet-at-home.com. The defending champions were EC KAC. On 11 April 2022, EC Red Bull Salzburg won the Austrian Hockey Championship for the 7th time in their history.

Teams

Standings

Regular season

Statistics

Scoring leaders

The following shows the top ten players who led the league in points, at the conclusion of games played on 24 February 2022. If two or more skaters are tied (i.e. same number of points, goals and played games), all of the tied skaters are shown.

Leading goaltenders
The following shows the top ten goaltenders who led the league in goals against average, provided that they have played at least 40% of their team's minutes, at the conclusion of games played on 2 October 2021.

Playoffs

Bracket

Pre-playoffs

(7) Orli Znojmo vs. (10) Graz 99ers

(8) EC KAC vs. (9) HCB Südtirol Alperia

Quarter-finals

(1) EC Red Bull Salzburg vs. (7) HC Orli Znojmo

(2) EC VSV vs. (6) HK Olimpija

(3) Fehérvár AV19 vs. (5) HC Pustertal Wölfe

(4) Vienna Capitals vs. (8) EC KAC

Semi-finals

(1) EC Red Bull Salzburg - (4) Vienna Capitals

(2) EC VSV - (3) Fehérvár AV19

Final

References

External links 

Austrian Hockey League seasons
2021–22 in European ice hockey leagues
2021–22 in Italian ice hockey
2021–22 in Hungarian ice hockey
2021–22 in Slovak ice hockey
2021–22 in Czech ice hockey
2021–22 in Slovenian ice hockey